"What Do I Have to Do?" is a song by American industrial rock band Stabbing Westward. The song was released as the first single from the band's 1996 album Wither Blister Burn & Peel. The song is considered the group's first hit and breakout single.

Background

In a 2020 interview with Songfacts, lead singer Christopher Hall said:

Music video
The song's music video begins with a shot of vocalist Christopher Hall standing in a desert, before falling backwards. The song begins with a woman singing the first verse. When the chorus starts, the video cuts to a shot of the band performing in the desert. At the end of the chorus, a car drives off. During the second verse, the video cuts between shots of the band performing and the car driving. At the video's end, the camera pulls around and reveals that Hall and the woman have both died.

Track listing

Personnel
 Christopher Hall – lead vocals
 Mark Eliopulos – guitar, backing vocals
 Jim Sellers – bass
 Walter Flakus – keyboards, programming
 Andy Kubiszewski – drums, backing vocals

Charts

References

1996 singles
Stabbing Westward songs
Columbia Records singles
1996 songs
Songs written by Christopher Hall (musician)
Songs written by Andy Kubiszewski